Nelson Farm or Nelson Barn may refer to:

Nelson Farm, Merrick County, Nebraska
Nelson Family Farm, Livermore, ME, listed on the NRHP in Maine
Nelson-Pettis Farmsteads Historic District, St. Joseph, MO, listed on the NRHP in Missouri
Ole Nelson Barn, Summit, SD, listed on the NRHP in South Dakota
Olson-Nelson Farm, Clifton, TX, listed on the NRHP in Texas
Nelson Farmstead, Gainesville, TX, listed on the NRHP in Texas
Albert Nelson Farmstead, Ellensburg, WA, listed on the NRHP in Washington

See also
Nelson House (disambiguation)